Guider (sometimes spelled Guidder) is a city situated in Cameroon's North Province, close to the border with Chad. It has a population of 65,165. Guider is the departmental capital of the Mayo-Louti.

Sports
The city is home to Espérance FC, that competes in the Cameroon Premiere Division. Stade Municipal de Guider is a multi-use stadium in the city, serving as home ground of the club.

References

External links 
 

Populated places in North Region (Cameroon)